The 1995–96 Scottish Premier Division season was the second season involving a relegation playoff with the Scottish First Division. The season began on 26 August 1995.

Overview
The 1995–96 Scottish Premier Division season ended in success for Rangers who won the title by four points from nearest rivals Celtic to clinch eight titles in a row, despite Celtic losing only one league match in the entire season. Falkirk were relegated to the First Division after finishing bottom with Partick Thistle also being relegated after losing the relegation playoff to Dundee United. As champions, Rangers qualified for the Champions League while Celtic were joined by third-placed Aberdeen in qualifying for the UEFA Cup. Fourth-placed Hearts qualified for the Cup Winners' Cup as Scottish Cup runners-up.

The season began on 26 August with the first goal of the season scored by Aberdeen's John Inglis as they won 3–2 away to Falkirk. The regular league season ended on 4 May with Hibernian's Darren Jackson netting a late winner in a 1–0 win at home to Partick Thistle to claim the final goal of the season.

Clubs

Promotion and relegation from 1994–95
Promoted from First Division to Premier League
Raith Rovers

Relegated from Premier Division to First Division
Dundee United

Stadia and locations

Managers

Managerial changes

Events
 14 October: Gordon Durie hits the first hat-trick of the season in a 4–0 win at Partick Thistle.
 28 April: Rangers win the title at Ibrox as a Paul Gascoigne hat-trick helps them to a 3–1 win over Aberdeen.

League table

Results

Matches 1–18
During matches 1–18 each team plays every other team twice (home and away).

Matches 19–36
During matches 19–36 each team plays every other team a further two times (home and away).

Play-off
A two leg play-off took place between the 9th placed team in the Premier Division (Partick Thistle) and the runner-up of the First Division (Dundee United) for a place in the 1996–97 Scottish Premier Division.

The first leg at Firhill Stadium finished 1–1 and the second leg at Tannadice Park four days later also finished 1–1 after 90 minutes, meaning extra time was required to separate the teams. Owen Coyle scored for Dundee United during extra time, meaning Dundee United won 3–2 on aggregate, and returned to the Premier Division and Partick Thistle were relegated to the First Division.

Top scorers

Source: Soccerbot

See also
Nine in a row

References

Scottish Premier Division seasons
Scot
1995–96 Scottish Football League